Ukraine competed at the 2007 Summer Universiade in Bangkok, Thailand, from 8 to 18 August 2007. Ukrainian athletes did not compete in badminton, golf, softball, and water polo. Ukrainian men's basketball team finished 14th. Ukrainian men's volleyball team finished 6th.

Medal summary

Medal by sports

Medalists

See also
 Ukraine at the 2007 Winter Universiade

References

Nations at the 2007 Summer Universiade
2007 in Ukrainian sport
2007